At least two ships of the Royal Navy have been named HMS Marmion :

  was an  launched in 1915 and sunk in 1917.

Royal Navy ship names